Jesse Douglas (3 July 1897 – 7 September 1965) was an American mathematician and Fields Medalist known for his general solution to Plateau's problem.

Life and career
He was born to a Jewish family in New York City, the son of Sarah (née Kommel) and Louis Douglas. He attended City College of New York as an undergraduate, graduating with honors in Mathematics in 1916.  He then moved to Columbia University as a graduate student, obtaining a PhD in mathematics in 1920.

Douglas was one of two winners of the first Fields Medals, awarded in 1936. He was honored for solving, in 1930, the problem of Plateau, which asks whether a minimal surface exists for a given boundary. The problem, open since 1760 when Lagrange raised it, is part of the calculus of variations and is also known as the soap bubble problem. Douglas also made significant contributions to the inverse problem of the calculus of variations. The American Mathematical Society awarded him the Bôcher Memorial Prize in 1943.

Douglas later became a full professor at the City College of New York (CCNY), where he taught until his death. At the time CCNY only offered undergraduate degrees and Professor Douglas taught the advanced calculus course. Sophomores (and freshmen with advanced placement) were privileged to get their introduction to real analysis from a Fields medalist.

Selected papers

See also
Petr–Douglas–Neumann theorem

Notes

References
Biography in Dictionary of Scientific Biography (New York 1970–1990)
Biography in Encyclopædia Britannica (Aug. 2003)

Further reading 
Themistocles M. Rassias, The Problem of Plateau – A tribute to Jesse Douglas and Tibor Rado (River Edge, NJ, 1992).
M. Struwe: Plateau's Problem and the Calculus of Variations, 
R. Bonnett and A. T. Fomenko: The Plateau Problem (Studies in the Development of Modern Mathematics), 
M. Giaquinta and S. Hildebrandt: "Calculus of Variations",  Volumes I and II, Springer Verlag

External links 

1897 births
1965 deaths
20th-century American mathematicians
City College of New York faculty
Columbia Graduate School of Arts and Sciences alumni
Differential geometers
Fields Medalists
Institute for Advanced Study visiting scholars
Jewish American scientists
Mathematical analysts
Mathematicians from New York (state)
Scientists from New York City
Variational analysts
Members of the United States National Academy of Sciences